Puerto Nuevo is a barrio in the municipality of Vega Baja, Puerto Rico. Its population in 2010 was 5,908.

History
Puerto Rico was ceded by Spain in the aftermath of the Spanish–American War under the terms of the Treaty of Paris of 1898 and became an unincorporated territory of the United States. In 1899, the United States Department of War conducted a census of Puerto Rico finding that the population of Puerto Nuevo barrio was 706.

Puerto Nuevo Beach
Mar Bella Beach, colloquially known as the Puerto Nuevo Beach, has received Blue Flag beach ratings two years in a row, as of 2019, for being a high quality beach. In the high season the beach receives up to 15,000 visitors.

Gallery

See also

 List of communities in Puerto Rico
 Reggaeton

References

Barrios of Vega Baja, Puerto Rico
Articles containing video clips